Central Christian School is a private K-12 Christian school located in Hutchinson, Kansas. It also has a preschool and daycare. The school is often referred to by the shortened name of "Central". The school mascot is the Cougars, and they are somewhat well known for their basketball program. Recently, Central's high school boys basketball team have made it to the state competition for 5 consecutive years, their third and fifth time placing 4th place.

The school was established by local Mennonite organizations and opened in 1950 as Central Kansas Bible Academy.  The name was changed to Central Christian High School in 1955.  As of 2014, the high school had an enrollment of 53 individuals, which places its athletic teams in the Kansas State High School Activities Association Class 1A. Also as of 2014, Central's annual high school tuition was approximately $5,500. As of 2015–16, there are nearly 200 students enrolled in the entire school.

References

External links
Central Christian School official website

Christian schools in Kansas
Private high schools in Kansas
Educational institutions established in 1950
Hutchinson, Kansas
Schools in Reno County, Kansas
1950 establishments in Kansas